Dicranosterna is a genus of leaf beetles, in the subfamily Chrysomelinae.

These beetles are hemispherical and the larvae are globular (spherical).  The elytra have coarse punctures which are non striate (non aligned).

There are 36 species and they occur throughout Australia.

Dicranosterna is endemic to Australia. Host-plant is Acacia The record for Eucalyptus (Jolivet and
Hawkeswood 1995) is erroneous (Reid 2002c).   Larvae are globular, with inconspicuous setae and a pair of dorsal glands, and lack apicoventral (rear) pseudopoda (prolegs).

Gallery

Species

 
 Dicranosterna abdominalis Chapuis, 1877
 Dicranosterna aeraria (Chapuis, 1877)
 Dicranosterna alessandrae (Daccordi, 2005)
 Dicranosterna bicolor (Daccordi, 2003)
 Dicranosterna bipuncticollis (Chapuis, 1877)
 Dicranosterna circe (Stål, 1860)
 Dicranosterna coccinelloides (Olivier, 1807)
 Dicranosterna contracta (Chapuis, 1877)
 Dicranosterna foraminosa (Chapuis, 1877)
 Dicranosterna globata (Chapuis, 1877)
 Dicranosterna globulosa (Chapuis, 1877)
 Dicranosterna hastata (Chapuis, 1877)
 Dicranosterna hemisphaerica (Chapuis, 1877)
 Dicranosterna immaculata (Marsham, 1808)
 Dicranosterna lateralis (Blackburn, 1893)
 Dicranosterna limbata (Weise, 1917)
 Dicranosterna mimulav (Blackburn, 1890)
 Dicranosterna ngarinmana (Daccordi, 2003)
 Dicranosterna nigrosuturalis (Lea, 1924)
 Dicranosterna novemlineata (Lea, 1924)
 Dicranosterna oblonga (Chapuis, 1877)
 Dicranosterna palmensis (Blackburn, 1896)
 Dicranosterna picea (Olivier, 1807)
 Dicranosterna prolixa (Weise, 1917)
 Dicranosterna rubeola (Chapuis, 1877)
 Dicranosterna ruffoi Daccordi, 2003
 Dicranosterna selene (Blackburn, 1901)
 Dicranosterna semipunctata (Chapuis, 1877)
 Dicranosterna septentrionalis (Weise, 1917)
 Dicranosterna stali (Chapuis, 1877)
 Dicranosterna subaeraria (Lea, 1924)
 Dicranosterna subovalis (Chapuis, 1877)
 Dicranosterna trimorpha (Lea, 1924)
 Dicranosterna umbrata (Chapuis, 1877)
 Dicranosterna valica Daccordi, 2003
 Dicranosterna vexabilis Weise, 1917

References

Chrysomelinae
Beetles of Australia
Chrysomelidae genera
Taxa named by Victor Motschulsky